Harry Campbell (born 16 November 1995) is a professional footballer who played as goalkeeper for Burton Albion.

Having spent 10 years at his boyhood club Blackburn Rovers and a spell as a professional at Bolton Wanderers, Campbell joined Burton in 2016.

Campbell made his professional debut in the EFL Cup on 28 August 2018 coming on as a 31st minute substitute for the injured regular keeper, Stephen Bywater. Campbell made a last-minute penalty save from Albert Adomah to help earn Burton a 1–0 upset win against the team from a higher division. Burton would go on to reach the semi-final that season which they lost to Manchester City. Campbell’s performance against Aston Villa has been called ‘the greatest debut in Carabao Cup history’.

Campbell was released from Burton at the end of the 2018–19 season.

References

1995 births
Living people
Footballers from Blackburn
Blackburn Rovers F.C. players
Bolton Wanderers F.C. players
Burton Albion F.C. players
English Football League players
Association football goalkeepers
English footballers